Ngô Xuân Sơn (born 17 January 1997) is a Vietnamese footballer who plays as a goalkeeper for V.League 1 club  Viettel

Honours

Club
Viettel F.C
V.League 2
 Runners-up :  2016

International
Vietnam U21
International U-21 Thanh Niên Newspaper Cup
 Runners-up :  : 2017

References

1997 births
Living people
Vietnamese footballers
Association football goalkeepers
Viettel FC players